Diede de Groot and Aniek van Koot defeated the defending champion Marjolein Buis and her partner Sabine Ellerbrock in the final, 5–7, 7–6(7–4), [10–8] to win the women's doubles wheelchair tennis title at the 2019 Australian Open. It was their first step towards an eventual Grand Slam, and de Groot completed the career Grand Slam with the win.

Buis and Yui Kamiji were the defending champions, but did not participate together. Kamiji partnered Giulia Capocci, but was defeated in the semifinals by de Groot and van Koot.

Seeds

Draw

Draw

References 

General

 Drawsheets on ausopen.com

Specific

Wheelchair Women's Doubles
2019 Women's Doubles